Ascochyta caricae is a fungal plant pathogen that causes dry rot on papaya.

See also
List of Ascochyta species

References

Ascochyta

External links
 Index Fungorum
 USDA ARS Fungal Database

Fungal plant pathogens and diseases
Papaya tree diseases
caricae
Fungi described in 1851
Taxa named by Gottlob Ludwig Rabenhorst